The Delaware and Hudson Rail Trail is a  rail trail built along an abandoned Delaware & Hudson Railway (D&H) corridor between West Rupert and Castleton, Vermont. The trail runs in two disconnected segments, separated by a short section that leaves the state for neighboring New York State before returning to Vermont. The trail is a state park and is managed by the Vermont Department of Forests, Parks, and Recreation.

The former corridor was the D&H's Washington Branch, whose trains were known locally as the “Slate Picker”. The D&H Washington Branch ran from Eagle Bridge, New York, to Castleton, Vermont. D&H abandoned the Eagle Bridge-Salem, New York section in 1980 and sold the railbed to Ron Crowd with a grant from the Urban Development Corporation.

The Poultney-Castleton, Vermont and Rupert, Vermont-Granville, New York segments were sold to the Vermont Agency of Transportation and subsequently converted to the D&H rail trail.

The Salem, New York-West Rupert, Vermont and West Pawlet, Vermont-Granville, New York segments were sold to the New York State Department of Transportation. A rail trail was slated by the state, but were halted at the government level, resulting in several sections reverting to local property owners.

References

External links 
 D & H Rail Trail - Vermont Department of Forests, Parks, and Recreation
 D&H Rail Trail map

Hiking trails in Vermont
Hiking trails in New York (state)
Rail trails in Vermont
Rail trails in New York (state)
Castleton, Vermont
Pawlet, Vermont
Poultney, Vermont
Rupert, Vermont
Protected areas of Bennington County, Vermont
Protected areas of Rutland County, Vermont
State parks of Vermont